This page includes a list of notable Mennonites.

General list
Harold S. Bender, professor of theology at Goshen College
David Bergen, Giller Prize winning author
Travis Bergen, baseball player
JC Chasez, solo artist and singer for NSYNC
Christopher Dock, educator
Abraham Esau, German physicist
Howard Dyck, Canadian conductor and broadcaster
Dietrich Enns, baseball player
Brendan Fehr, actor linked to TV show Roswell
Eric Fehr, hockey player
Henry Friesen, endocrinologist who discovered Prolactin
Jeff Friesen, former hockey player
Byron Froese, hockey player
Johann Funk, early Canadian Mennonite bishop
Joseph Funk, U.S. music teacher and publisher
Michael Funk, former hockey player
Owen Gingerich, Smithsonian astronomer
Girl Named Tom, winners of season 21 of The Voice
Steven Goertzen, former hockey player
Joseph B. Hagey, bishop
Vincent Harding, African-American historian, theologian and civil-rights activist
Hans Herr, bishop
Jeff Hostetler, NFL quarterback
Julia Kasdorf, poet
Graham Kerr, "The Galloping Gourmet"
Cindy Klassen, five time Olympic medalist
Clayton Kratz, relief worker
Erik Kratz, American professional baseball catcher currently in the Milwaukee Brewers organization.
Alan Kreider, author and employee of the Associated Mennonite Biblical Seminary
Floyd Landis, professional road bicycle racer
John Paul Lederach, professor of International Peacebuilding
Le Thi Hong Lien, teacher and former political prisoner
María Gloria Penayo De Duarte, Paraguayan first lady, her husband Nicanor Duarte, is a nominal Catholic who attends her church
Dustin Penner, former hockey player 
Casey Plett, writer
Nguyen Hong Quang, Vice President of the Mennonite Church in Vietnam
Richie Regehr, former hockey player
Robyn Regehr, former hockey player
A. James Reimer, Canadian Mennonite theologian
James Reimer, hockey player
John D. Roth, Mennonite scholar
Menno Simons, theologian; Mennonitism named for him
Jerome Monroe Smucker, founder of The J.M. Smucker Company
Dan Snyder, hockey player
Gene Stoltzfus, American peace activist, founding director of Christian Peacemaker Teams
Brad Thiessen, hockey player
David Toews, hockey player
Jonathan Toews, hockey player
Miriam Toews, best-selling author, winner of the 2004 Governor General's Literary Award
Andrew Unger, novelist and author of The Daily Bonnet
Garry Unger, former hockey player
Pierre Widmer, French Mennonite pastor and editor
Armin Wiebe, author
Rudy Wiebe, Canadian author and professor who was raised Mennonite so knew no English until age 6
Harvey L. Wollman, former Governor of South Dakota
John Howard Yoder, theologian and pacifist

Canadian politicians connected to the Mennonites
Albert Driedger, cabinet minister under Gary Filmon and also a director of the Elim Mennonite Church.  
Jacob Froese, only Manitoba Social Credit Party MLA between 1959 and 1973, and was the party's leader for most if not all of the period from 1959 to 1977
Kelvin Goertzen, 23rd Premier of Manitoba
Harold Neufeld, cabinet minister under Gary Filmon and currently Chair of the Menno Simons College Foundation
Vic Toews, Conservative Party of Canada member and a judge of the Court of Queen's Bench of Manitoba
Brad Wall, former Premier of Saskatchewan
Cornelius Wiebe, first Mennonite to serve in the Manitoba legislature

Note: Several Canadian political figures have a Mennonite background. This might be more common in Canada than in most nations. This is perhaps most true in the case of Manitoba, though Saskatchewan and British Columbia also have significant Mennonites in politics. As this more concerns "connected to" this may include people who are ethnic Mennonites and not necessarily members of Mennonite churches.

People of Mennonite ancestry or background
This is mostly people whose Mennonite ancestry or upbringing is important to them, but who are not currently Mennonite. In some cases names listed here include people whose current status as Mennonites is undetermined.

Sandra Birdsell, Canadian poet
Di Brandt, Canadian poet
Greg Brenneman, former CEO of Burger King
John Denver, folk singer-songwriter
Dwight D. Eisenhower, thirty-fourth President of the United States (1953–1961). Eisenhower's direct ancestor, Hans Nicol Eisenhauer, was a Mennonite who settled in Lancaster, Pennsylvania in 1741.
Katherine Esau, American botanist
Patrick Friesen, Canadian poet
Simon Gerber, Swiss musician
Anna German, Polish singer
Philip D. Gingerich, paleontologist
Malcolm Gladwell, English-Canadian journalist, bestselling author, and speaker who has made a return to religion though not of a specific church at the moment.
Jon Gnagy, American art instructor on television
Matt Groening, American cartoonist, creator of The Simpsons. His father, Homer Groening, was born and raised in a Plautdietsch-speaking Mennonite family from Saskatchewan.
Joey Kelly, former member of The Kelly Family
James L. Kraft, founder of Kraft Foods
Milton Hershey, founder of The Hershey Company
Robyn Regehr, hockey player
Adolph Rupp, college basketball coach
Marlin Stutzman, politician who was raised Mennonitem but is now Baptist. 
Hermann Sudermann, German dramatist and novelist
Dick Winters, U.S. Army Major and World War II commander of Band of Brothers' Easy Company

People incorrectly identified as Mennonite
George Armstrong Custer, erroneously identified as coming from Mennonite background by biographer Milo Milton Quaife.

References

Mennonites